Beverly Powell (born September 18, 1951), is an American politician from the state of Texas. A Democrat, she represented District 10 in the Texas Senate from 2019 to 2023. 

In 2018, Powell defeated incumbent Republican Senator Konni Burton by a margin of 3.4%. During redistricting in 2021, Texas Republicans redrew District 10 to be much more conservative and Powell opted to withdraw from her re-election campaign in 2022, citing the district as 'unwinnable' for a Democrat, and suggesting that the Democratic Party should fund other races instead. She was defeated by then-State Representative Phil King from Weatherford, Texas.

References

External links
 Profile at the Texas Senate
 Campaign website
 Beverly Powell at Texas Tribune

Living people
Politicians from Fort Worth, Texas
Texas Wesleyan University alumni
Place of birth missing (living people)
Democratic Party Texas state senators
Women state legislators in Texas
21st-century American politicians
21st-century American women politicians
1951 births